Mohammadabad-e Gowd Ginestan (also Romanized as Moḩammadābād-e Gowd Gīnestān) is a village in Sabzdasht Rural District, in the Central District of Bafq County, Yazd Province, Iran. As of the 2006 census, its population was 7, with there being 4 families.

References 

Populated places in Bafq County